Quinte Health Care is a hospital organization that operates four hospitals in Ontario, Canada.

Organization 

Although known as Quinte Health Care, the official name of the organisation is Quinte Healthcare Corporation (QHC). QHC is a hospital organization that manages Belleville General Hospital, North Hastings Hospital (in Bancroft), Prince Edward County Memorial Hospital, and Trenton Memorial Hospital.

History and leadership 
Amid rising debt, the Ontario Ministry of Health took over QHC in 2009. 

As of 2010, Mary Clare Egberts was the President and Chief Executive Officer. As of 2022, Jeff Hohenkerk was the Vice President.

References

External links 

 Official website

Hospital networks in Canada
Medical and health organizations based in Ontario